In algebraic topology, a homology sphere is an n-manifold X having the homology groups of an n-sphere, for some integer . That is,

 

and

 for all other i.

Therefore X is a connected space, with one non-zero higher Betti number,  namely, . It does not follow that X is simply connected, only that its fundamental group is perfect (see Hurewicz theorem).

A rational homology sphere is defined similarly but using homology with rational coefficients.

Poincaré homology sphere

The Poincaré homology sphere (also known as Poincaré dodecahedral space) is a particular example of a homology sphere, first constructed by Henri Poincaré.  Being a spherical 3-manifold, it is the only homology 3-sphere (besides the 3-sphere itself) with a finite fundamental group.  Its fundamental group is known as the binary icosahedral group and has order 120.  Since the fundamental group of the 3-sphere is trivial, this shows that there exist 3-manifolds with the same homology groups as the 3-sphere that are not homeomorphic to it.

Construction
A simple construction of this space begins with a dodecahedron. Each face of the dodecahedron is identified with its opposite face, using the minimal clockwise twist to line up the faces. Gluing each pair of opposite faces together using this identification yields a closed 3-manifold. (See Seifert–Weber space for a similar construction, using more "twist", that results in a hyperbolic 3-manifold.)

Alternatively, the Poincaré homology sphere can be constructed as the quotient space SO(3)/I where I is the icosahedral group (i.e., the rotational symmetry group of the regular icosahedron and dodecahedron, isomorphic to the alternating group A5). More intuitively, this means that the Poincaré homology sphere is the space of all geometrically distinguishable positions of an icosahedron (with fixed center and diameter) in Euclidean 3-space. One can also pass instead to the universal cover of SO(3) which can be realized as the group of unit quaternions and is homeomorphic to the 3-sphere.

Another approach is by Dehn surgery. The Poincaré homology sphere results from +1 surgery on the right-handed trefoil knot.

Cosmology
In 2003, lack of structure on the largest scales (above 60 degrees) in the cosmic microwave background as observed for one year by the WMAP spacecraft led to the suggestion, by Jean-Pierre Luminet of the Observatoire de Paris and colleagues, that the shape of the universe is a Poincaré sphere. In 2008, astronomers found the best orientation on the sky for the model and confirmed some of the predictions of the model, using three years of observations by the WMAP spacecraft.
As of 2016, the publication of data analysis from the Planck spacecraft suggests that there is no observable non-trivial topology to the universe.

Constructions and examples

Surgery on a knot in the 3-sphere S3 with framing +1 or −1 gives a homology sphere.
More generally, surgery on a link gives a homology sphere whenever the matrix given by intersection numbers (off the diagonal) and framings (on the diagonal) has determinant +1 or −1.
If p, q, and r are pairwise relatively prime positive integers then the link of the singularity xp + yq + zr = 0 (in other words, the intersection of a small 5-sphere around 0 with this complex surface) is a Brieskorn manifold that is a homology 3-sphere, called a Brieskorn 3-sphere Σ(p, q, r). It is homeomorphic to the standard 3-sphere if one of p, q, and r is 1, and Σ(2, 3, 5) is the Poincaré sphere.
The connected sum of two oriented homology 3-spheres is a homology 3-sphere. A homology 3-sphere that cannot be written as a connected sum of two homology 3-spheres is called irreducible or prime, and every homology 3-sphere can be written as a connected sum of prime homology 3-spheres in an essentially unique way.  (See Prime decomposition (3-manifold).)
Suppose that  are integers all at least 2 such that any two are coprime. Then the Seifert fiber space

 

over the sphere with exceptional fibers of degrees a1, ..., ar is a homology sphere, where the b'''s are chosen so that

 

(There is always a way to choose the b′s, and the homology sphere does not depend (up to isomorphism) on the choice of b′s.) If r is at most 2 this is just the usual 3-sphere; otherwise they are distinct non-trivial homology spheres. If the a′s are 2, 3, and 5 this gives the Poincaré sphere. If there are at least 3 a′s, not 2, 3, 5, then this is an acyclic  homology 3-sphere with infinite fundamental group  that  has a Thurston geometry modeled on the universal cover of SL2(R).

Invariants
The Rokhlin invariant is a -valued invariant of homology 3-spheres.
The Casson invariant is an integer valued invariant of homology 3-spheres, whose reduction mod 2 is the Rokhlin invariant.

Applications
If A is a homology 3-sphere not homeomorphic to the standard 3-sphere, then the suspension of A is an example of a 4-dimensional homology manifold that is not a topological manifold. The double suspension of A is homeomorphic to the standard 5-sphere, but its triangulation (induced by some triangulation of A) is not a PL manifold. In other words, this gives an example of a finite simplicial complex that is a topological manifold but not a PL manifold. (It is not a PL manifold because the link of a point is not always a 4-sphere.)

Galewski and Stern showed that all compact topological manifolds (without boundary) of dimension at least 5 are homeomorphic to simplicial complexes if and only if there is a homology 3 sphere Σ with Rokhlin invariant 1 such that the connected sum Σ#Σ of Σ with itself bounds a smooth acyclic 4-manifold.  the existence of such a homology 3-sphere was an unsolved problem. On March 11, 2013, Ciprian Manolescu posted a preprint on the ArXiv claiming to show that there is no such homology sphere with the given property, and therefore, there are 5-manifolds not homeomorphic to simplicial complexes. In particular, the example originally given by Galewski and Stern is not triangulable.

See also
 Eilenberg–MacLane space
 Moore space (algebraic topology)

References

Selected reading
  
 
 Robion Kirby, Martin Scharlemann, Eight faces of the Poincaré homology 3-sphere. Geometric topology (Proc. Georgia Topology Conf., Athens, Ga., 1977), pp. 113–146, Academic Press, New York-London, 1979.
 
 Nikolai Saveliev, Invariants of Homology 3-Spheres'', Encyclopaedia of Mathematical Sciences, vol 140. Low-Dimensional Topology, I. Springer-Verlag, Berlin, 2002.

External links
A 16-Vertex Triangulation of the Poincaré Homology 3-Sphere and Non-PL Spheres with Few Vertices by Anders Björner and Frank H. Lutz
Lecture by David Gillman on The best picture of Poincare's homology sphere 

Topological spaces
Homology theory
3-manifolds
Spheres